Whit may refer to:

 Whit or Whitsun, another name for the holy day of Pentecost
 Whit (given name)
 Whit (novel), by Iain Banks
 WHIT, a radio station licensed to Madison, Wisconsin, United States, which holds the call sign WHIT beginning 2009
 WCSY (AM), a radio station licensed to South Haven, Michigan, United States, which held the call sign WHIT from 2005 to 2009
 WHKF, a radio station licensed to Harrisburg, Pennsylvania, United States, which held the call sign WHIT from 1987 to 1988

See also
 Whit's Diner, a historic diner in Framingham, Massachusetts
 Whit Rock, off the coast of Graham Land, Antarctica
 Whitt (disambiguation)